René Felber (14 March 1933 – 18 October 2020) was a Swiss politician. He was a member of the Swiss Federal Council from 1987 to 1993. In 1992, he served as the President of Switzerland.

Personal life
Born 1933 in Bienne, Felber was a teacher in Boudevilliers and Le Locle (canton of Neuchâtel).

Felber died on 18 October 2020 at the age of 87.

Political career
He was mayor of Le Locle from 1964 to 1980 (in charge of gas and electricity supply and then of Finance), member of the Cantonal Parliament of Neuchâtel (1965–1976). He sat in the National Council from 1967 to 1981 when he became a member of the Conseil d'Etat (State Council) of the canton of Neuchâtel in charge of the Finance Department until his election to the Federal Council. In 1980/81, he was the floor leader of the Social Democratic Party in the Federal Parliament.

He was elected to the Swiss Federal Council on 9 December 1987 as member of the Canton of Neuchâtel and for the Social Democratic Party.

During his time in office, he headed the Federal Department of Foreign Affairs and was President of the Confederation in 1992. Felber fought for Swiss membership in the European Economic Area, a proposal that was narrowly defeated in a referendum on 6 December 1992.

He resigned from the council on 31 March 1993 for health reasons.

References

External links

1933 births
People from Biel/Bienne
Members of the Federal Council (Switzerland)
Social Democratic Party of Switzerland politicians
Foreign ministers of Switzerland
Swiss schoolteachers
2020 deaths